Fishbone 101: Nuttasaurusmeg Fossil Fuelin' the Fonkay is a two-CD 1996 compilation album by the alternative/funk/rock band Fishbone. The first disc contains album tracks (some in edited versions) from the Fishbone albums up to 1993. The second disc contains B-sides, alternate versions, EP tracks, demos, and other non-album items from the same time period. "The Goose" is a previously unreleased cover of the song by the funk band Parliament. The previously unreleased demo track "Alcoholic" was later rerecorded for the 1996 studio album Chim Chim's Badass Revenge. The previously unreleased demo track "Pink Vapor Stew" was later reworked as "Party at Ground Zero" on the debut Fishbone and another demo recording "Game of Destruction" was also reworked as "Pressure" on their third LP The Reality of My Surroundings.

Track listing

Personnel
Angelo Moore - saxophone, vocals
Walter A. Kibby II - trumpet, vocals
Kendall Jones - guitar, vocals
Chris Dowd - keyboards, trombone, vocals
John Norwood Fisher - bass, vocals
Philip "Fish" Fisher - drums
John Bigham - keyboards, guitar, vocals (on songs released in 1990 and thereafter)

References

Fishbone albums
Albums produced by David Kahne
1996 compilation albums